The 1961 IAAF World Race Walking Cup was held in Lugano, Ticino, Switzerland, on October 15–16, 1961.  The event was also known as Lugano Trophy.

Complete results were published.

Medallists

Results

Men's 20 km

Men's 50 km

Team
From this edition up to 1997, the team ranking was named Lugano Trophy and combined the results of the 20km and 50km races..

Participation

 (6)
 (6)
 (6)
 (6)

Qualifying rounds 
From 1961 to 1985 there were qualifying rounds with the winners proceeding to the final.

Zone 1
London, United Kingdom, August 12

†: Combined East and West German Team.

Zone 2
København, Denmark, August 26/27

Zone 3
Spoleto, Italy, September 3

Zone 4
Cancelled

References

World Athletics Race Walking Team Championships
World Race Walking Cup
International athletics competitions hosted by Switzerland
World Race Walking Cup